Methanospirillaceae are a family of microbes within Methanomicrobiales.

This family contains only one genus, Methanospirillum. All its species are methanogenic archaea. The cells are bar-shaped and can form long filaments.  Most produce energy via the reduction of carbon dioxide with hydrogen, but some species can also use formate as a substrate.  They are Gram-negative and move using flagella on the sides of the cells. They are strictly anaerobic, and found in wetland soil and anaerobic stages of water treatment systems.

See also
 List of Archaea genera

References

Further reading

Scientific journals

Scientific books
 

Archaea taxonomic families
Euryarchaeota